T. K. Kala is an Indian playback singer who sings in Tamil, Kannada and Telugu languages. Kala is also an actress who plays supporting roles in Tamil films and voice actor. She received the Kalaimamani award in 2006. She is the daughter of actress Shanmugasundari.

Career
Born to actress Shanmugasundari, Kala was well trained in music and was a regular choice for songs featuring child actors. She got her major breakthrough when noticed by A P Nagarajan and made her singing debut in the film "Agathiyar" with the song "Thaayir sirandha kovilum illai". She made her acting debut portraying Prakash Raj's mother in Ghilli (2004).

Filmography

Discography

References

Year of birth missing (living people)
Living people
Tamil playback singers
Telugu playback singers
Tamil singers
Indian women playback singers
20th-century Indian women singers
21st-century Indian women singers
21st-century Indian singers
20th-century Indian singers